Frankowo may refer to the following places:
Frankowo, Greater Poland Voivodeship (west-central Poland)
Frankowo, Kuyavian-Pomeranian Voivodeship (north-central Poland)
Frankowo, Masovian Voivodeship (east-central Poland)